The Grand National Teams (GNT) North American bridge championship is held at the summer American Contract Bridge League (ACBL) North American Bridge Championship (NABC).

The Grand National Teams is a team knockout event. The event is broken into four flights (Championship, A, B, C). The event is restricted to those who have qualified in their local ACBL district. No player on a flight A team can have more than 6,000 masterpoints. No player on a flight B team can have more than 2,500 masterpoints. No player on a flight C team can have more than 500 masterpoints, or be a Life Master.

All flights typically begin play on Wednesday, two days before the main NABC events.

The 2011 host district won Flights B and C in Toronto and thereby won the unofficial GNT Cup.

History

The United States Bridge Association, established by Ely Culbertson and his staff, conducted a Grand National Team-of-Four championship from 1934 to 1937 (the lifetime of the organization before merger created the ACBL).

The extended, grass-roots tournament was re-established in 1973, when about 1500 teams participated. Initial stages were contested in the 25 geographically defined ACBL Districts. Champions of eight Zones were determined in a semifinal stage, who qualified for the final stage at one of the North American NABC meets.

By 1980 there were 6032 teams in the first stage, although the distinct Canadian National Teams championship was introduced by the Canadian Bridge Federation that year, leaving only the 23 U.S. or partly U.S. districts in the GNT. (The ACBL encompasses Mexico and Bermuda, but each is entirely within a partly U.S. District.) 

The Zonal stage was eliminated in 1985; since then every District champion qualifies for the final at the Summer NABC. Conditions within the Districts differ; some now hold a single weekend tournament. Winners received some money to pay expenses in part.

Also in 1985, the event was divided in three Flights called A, B, and C. The Championship Flight was added in 2001. That is, Flights B and C were added to the Open Flight in 1985, with player eligibility restricted by upper limits on career masterpoints. In 2001 the previously  Flight A was renamed "Championship" or "Superflight" and Flight A was restricted to players with fewer than 5,000 career masterpoints.  the other ceilings were 2,000 points for Flight B players and 500 points for Flight C. In 2014 the cutoff for Flight A was raised to 6,000 masterpoints and the cutoff for Flight B was raised to 2,500 masterpoints.

The Open winners have their names engraved on the Morehead Trophy, donated by The New York Times in memory of its longtime bridge editor Albert H. Morehead.

Championship Flight

Lower flights

See also

References

Other sources

 List of previous winners for Championship Flight and Flight A, Pages 8, 9. 
 List of previous winners for Flight B and Flight C, Pages 6, 7. 
 2009 winners, Page 1. 
 2010 winners, Page 1. 
 "Search Results: GNT [one of four Flights]". ACBL. Visit "NABC Winners"; select a Summer NABC. Retrieved 2014-06-05.

External links
ACBL official website

North American Bridge Championships